Jiucheng is a town of Xinji City in southern Hebei province, China, located  northeast of downtown Xinji and in between G1811 Huanghua–Shijiazhuang Expressway and China National Highway 107. , it has 33 villages under its administration.

See also
List of township-level divisions of Hebei

References

Township-level divisions of Hebei